The Fort de Chaudfontaine is one of twelve forts built around Liège, Belgium, in the late 19th century. The overall Fortified Position of Liège was a constituent part of the country's National Redoubt. Fort de Chaudfontaine was built between 1881 and 1884 according to the plans of General Henri Alexis Brialmont. Contrasting with the French forts built in the same era by Raymond Adolphe Séré de Rivières, the fort was built exclusively of unreinforced concrete, a new material, rather than masonry. The fort was heavily bombarded by German artillery in the Battle of Liège. The fort is now used as an adventure park.

Description

The fort was built as an irregular rectangle, in contrast to most Brialmont forts, which were triangular. The principal armament was concentrated in the central massif. The ditches were defended in enfilade by 57 mm guns in casemates resembling counterscarp batteries, firing at shot traps at the other end of the ditch. The fort is one of the smaller Liège forts.

With the exception of the Fort de Loncin, the Belgian forts made little provision for the daily needs of their wartime garrisons, locating latrines, showers, kitchens and the morgue in the fort's counterscarp, a location that would be untenable in combat. This would have profound effects on the forts' ability to endure a long assault. The service areas were placed directly opposite the barracks, which opened into the ditch in the rear of the fort (i.e., in the face towards Liège), with lesser protection than  the two "salient" sides. The Brialmont forts placed a weaker side to the rear to allow for recapture by Belgian forces from the rear, and located the barracks and support facilities on this side, using the rear ditch for light and ventilation of living spaces. In combat heavy shellfire made the rear ditch untenable, and German forces were able to get between the forts and attack them from the rear.

The Brialmont forts were designed to be protected from shellfire equaling their heaviest guns: 21 cm. The top of the central massif used  of unreinforced concrete, while the caserne walls, judged to be less exposed, used . Under fire, the forts were damaged by 21 cm fire and could not withstand heavier artillery.

Armament
Chaudfontaine's armament included a Grusonwerke turret with a single 21 cm Krupp gun, a 15 cm Creusot turret with twin guns and a 12 cm Châtillon-Commentry turret with two Krupp guns, all for distant targets. Four Grusonwerke 57 mm gun turrets were provided for local defense. The fort also mounted an observation turret with a searchlight. Nine rapid-fire 57 mm guns were provided in casemates for the defense of the ditches and the postern.

The fort's heavy guns were German, typically Krupp, while the turret mechanisms were from a variety of sources. The fort was provided with signal lights to permit communication with the neighboring Fort de Loncin and Fort de Liers. The guns were fired using black powder rather than smokeless powder, producing choking gas in the confined firing spaces that spread throughout the fort.

First World War

Liège first came under attack on 6 August 1914. When the Liège's fortifications proved unexpectedly stubborn, the Germans brought heavy siege artillery to bombard the forts with shells far larger than they were designed to resist. Chaudfontaine was heavily bombarded starting 12 August, with firing rates of 200 to 300 shells per hour. On 13 August a shell hit the 21 cm turret, causing an explosion in the turret.  The explosion, fire and the resulting toxic fumes killed at least 58 of the garrison. With the interior atmosphere unbreathable, the fort surrendered that day.

Occupying the fort during the remainder of the war, Germans made a number of improvements to the fort in 1914 and 1915.

Fortified Position of Liège
Chaudfontaine's armament was upgraded in the 1930s to become part of the Fortified Position of Liège II, which was planned to deter a German incursion over the nearby border. The armament was upgraded with new guns in the turrets. This was accompanied by improvements to ventilation, protection, sanitary facilities, communications and electrical power. An air intake tower was added overlooking the Vesdre. New barracks were built at this time for peacetime accommodation. A large infantry shelter was constructed on the fort's glacis, intended to be linked to the main fort.

Second World War
Chaudfontaine came under attack during the Battle of Belgium on 16 May 1940. It was bombarded by the Luftwaffe in the early hours of the 17th, setting off explosions within the fort. A German attack in the daytime resulted in casualties among the garrison, and at 1930 hours the fort surrendered.

Present
The fort de Chaudfontaine is occupied by an adventure park. A small cemetery and war memorial are located just outside the main gate, containing the bodies of the 71 killed in 1914, including two from the Fort de Fléron, ten killed in the interval between the forts, and a civilian who was executed at Romsée.

Notes

References

Bibliography 
Donnell, Clayton, The Forts of the Meuse in World War I, Osprey Publishing, Oxford, 2007, .
Kauffmann, J.E., Jurga, R., Fortress Europe: European Fortifications of World War II, Da Capo Press, USA, 2002, .

External links 

 Le fort de Chaudfontaine 1914 & 1940  
 Revue de la Presse article on the fort's 1914 action, reprinted from 28 June 1918
 Fort de Chaudfontaine at fortiff.be 

Chaudfontaine
Chaudfontaine
Government buildings completed in 1884
Infrastructure completed in 1884
Chaudfontaine